The acronym CLX can refer to a number of things:
160 in Roman numerals
Cargolux, an airline using the ICAO code CLX 
Clorox stock ticker
CLX (Common Lisp), a Common Lisp computer library
CLX Communications, a telecommunications and cloud communications platform as a service company, based in Stockholm, Sweden
Component Library for Cross Platform (CLX), a cross-platform visual component-based framework